Babylon the Great, commonly known as the Whore of Babylon, refers to both a symbolic female figure and place of evil mentioned in the Book of Revelation in the Bible. Her full title is stated in Revelation 17 (verse 5) as "Mystery, Babylon the Great, the Mother of Harlots and Abominations of the Earth" (transliterated mystērion, Babylōn hē megalē, hē mētēr tōn pornōn kai tōn bdelygmatōn tēs gēs). Revelation 17 (verse 18) identifies the woman as a representation of "the great city which reigneth over the kings of the earth".

Passages from Revelation 
The "great whore" of the Book of Revelation is featured in chapter 17:

 — , King James Version

Symbolism 

The Whore is associated with the Beast of Revelation by connection with an equally evil kingdom. The word "Whore" can also be translated metaphorically as "Idolatress". The Whore's apocalyptic downfall is prophesied to take place in the hands of the image of the beast with seven heads and ten horns. There is much speculation within Christian eschatology on what the Whore and beast symbolize as well as the possible implications for contemporary interpretations.

Caroline Vander Stichele demonstrated that the narrative of the Whore of Babylon follows many of the same patterns of the personification of capital cities as women who commit "prostitution / whoredom" and/or "adultery" in the prophetic books of the Hebrew Bible. These capital cities, representing the states they govern, are alleged to have committed various sins that have rendered them sexually promiscuous, and therefore they will eventually be annihilated through various well-deserved violent punishments sent by the Israelite God Yahweh.

Preterist interpretations 
Some scholars interpret 'Babylon' as being based on historical places and events.

Rome and the Roman Empire 

First Peter implies the author is in "Babylon", which has been held to be a coded reference to Rome. Many Biblical scholars believe that "Babylon" is a metaphor for the pagan Roman Empire at the time it persecuted Christians, before the Edict of Milan in 313. According to Eusebius of Caesarea Babylon would be Rome or the Roman Empire:

Some biblical scholars recognize that "Babylon" is a cipher for Rome or the Roman Empire but believe Babylon is not limited to the Roman city of the first century.  Craig Koester says outright that "the whore is Rome, yet more than Rome."
It "is the Roman imperial world, which in turn represents the world alienated from God." Some exegetes interpret the passage as a scathing critique of a servant people of Rome who do the Empire's bidding, interpreting that the author of Revelation was speaking of the Herodians—a party of Jews friendly to Rome and open to its influence, like the Hellenizers of centuries past—and later, corrupt Hasmoneans, where the ruler of Jerusalem or Roman Judea exercised his power at the pleasure of the Roman emperor, and was dependent on Roman influence, like Herod the Great in the Gospel of Luke.

In 4 Ezra, 2 Baruch and the Sibylline Oracles, "Babylon" is a cryptic name for Rome. In Revelation 17:9 it is said that she sits on "seven mountains", typically understood as the seven hills of Rome. A Roman coin minted under the Emperor Vespasian (ca. 70 AD) depicts Rome as a woman sitting on seven hills.

According to the International Standard Bible Encyclopedia, "The characteristics ascribed to this Babylon apply to Rome rather than to any other city of that age: (a) as ruling over the kings of the earth (Revelation 17:18); (b) as sitting on seven mountains (Revelation 17:9); (c) as the center of the world's merchandise (Revelation 18:3, 11–13); (d) as the corrupter of the nations (Revelation 17:2; 18:3; 19:2); (e) as the persecutor of the saints (Revelation 17:6)."

Jerusalem 

Biblical scholars such as Alan James Beagley, David Chilton, J. Massyngberde Ford, Peter Gaskell, Kenneth Gentry, Edmondo Lupieri, Bruce Malina, Iain Provan, J. Stuart Russell, Milton S. Terry point out that although Rome was the prevailing pagan power in the 1st century, when the Book of Revelation was written, the symbolism of the whore of Babylon refers not to an invading infidel or foreign power. It refers to an apostate false queen, a former "bride" who has been unfaithful and who, even though she has been divorced and cast out because of unfaithfulness, continues to falsely claim to be the "queen" of the spiritual realm. This symbolism did not fit the case of Rome at the time. Proponents of this view suggest that the "seven mountains" in Rev 17:9 are the seven hills on which Jerusalem stands and the "fall of Babylon" in Rev 18 is the fall and destruction of Jerusalem in 70 AD.

Several Old Testament prophets referred to Jerusalem as being a spiritual harlot and a mother of such harlotry (Isaiah 1:21; Jeremiah 2:20; 3:1–11; Ezekiel 16:1–43; 23, as well as Epistle to the Galatians 4:25). Some of these Old Testament prophecies, as well as the warnings in the New Testament concerning Jerusalem, are in fact very close to the text concerning Babylon in Revelation. This suggests that John of Patmos may well have actually been citing those prophecies in his description of Babylon.

For example, in Matthew 23:34–37 and Luke 11:47–51, Jesus himself assigned all of the bloodguilt for the killing of the prophets and of the saints (of all time) to the Pharisees of Jerusalem. In Revelation 17:6 and 18:20,24, almost identical phrasing is used in charging that very same bloodguilt to Babylon. This is also bolstered by Jesus' statement that "it's not possible for a prophet to be killed outside of Jerusalem." (Luke 13:33).

Historicist and idealistic interpretations

Catholic view 

In the most common medieval (Catholic) view, deriving from Augustine of Hippo's The City of God (early 5th century), Babylon and Jerusalem referred to two spiritual cities which were spiritually at war with one another, throughout all of history:Babylon [from Babel] is interpreted confusion, Jerusalem vision of peace. ...They are mingled, and from the very beginning of mankind mingled they run on unto the end of the world. ...Two loves make up these two cities: love of God makes Jerusalem, love of the world makes Babylon.They also represented two principles at war with one another, inside each individual person, even inside seemingly worldly Christian monarchs; thus Augustine could boast approvingly, "...believing [Christian] monarchs of this world came to the city of Rome, as to the head of Babylon: they went not to the temple of the Emperor, but to the tomb of the Fisherman."

Reformation view 

Historicist interpreters commonly used the phrase "Whore of Babylon" to refer to the Catholic Church. Reformation writers Martin Luther (1483–1546, author of On the Babylonian Captivity of the Church), John Calvin (1509–1564), and John Knox (1510–1572, author of The First Blast of the Trumpet Against the Monstruous Regiment of Women) taught this association.

Most early Protestant Reformers believed, and the modern Seventh-day Adventist Church teaches, that in Bible prophecy a woman represents a church. The connection noted on the seven hills of Rome is argued to locate the church.

Identification of the Pope as the Antichrist was written into Protestant creeds such as the Westminster Confession of 1646. The identification of the Roman Catholic Church with the Whore of Babylon is kept in the Scofield Reference Bible (whose 1917 edition identified "ecclesiastical Babylon" with "apostate Christendom headed by the Papacy"). An image from the 1545 edition of Luther's Bible depicts the Whore as wearing the papal tiara.

Latter-day Saint view 
The Church of Jesus Christ of Latter-day Saints (LDS Church) views the Whore of Babylon and its Book of Mormon equivalent, the "great and abominable church", as having dominion over the entire earth and representing a powerful collection of groups and carnal individuals seeking wealth, sexual immorality, dominion, and the persecution or death of saints. The Whore of Babylon, or the Devil's Church, consists of all organisations not associated with the followers of Christ or that are against his followers. Ultimately, the Whore of Babylon's fate is to be destroyed in the last days.

Seventh-day Adventist view 
Seventh-day Adventists believe that the whore of Babylon represents the fallen state of traditional Christianity, especially the fallen state of Christianity in the Catholic Church. Other churches (predominantly Protestant) are generally considered either part of the harlot or her daughters. Adventists further hold the view that the persecution of the "saints" in Revelation 17:6 represents the persecution of believers who rejected the doctrines which were introduced by the Roman Catholic Church because they were based on pagan Roman beliefs. The Persecution of anyone who opposed the Catholic Church during the Middle Ages, especially by the Inquisition, and the persecution of the Waldensians and the Huguenots are cited as examples of this persecution.

Seventh-day Adventists interpret Revelation 17:18 as a prophecy about the false church, which has power over the kings of the earth. They consider the pope to be in apostasy for allowing pagan rituals, beliefs and ceremonies to come into the church. They consider the Papacy, as a continuation of the Roman Empire, to be a fulfillment of : "For the secret power of lawlessness is already at work; but the one who now holds it back will continue to do so till he is taken out of the way."

Ellen G. White's The Great Controversy (1858) states that "Spiritual Babylon" would have worldwide influence, affecting "all nations", that the Imperial Roman Empire could not meet the criteria, because she wrote that it only had influence in the Old World. Like many reformation-era Protestant leaders, her writings also describe the Catholic Church as a fallen church, and it plays a nefarious eschatological role as the antagonist against God's true church and that the pope is the Antichrist.

Jehovah's Witnesses view 
Jehovah's Witnesses, whose early teachings were strongly influenced by Adventism but have since diverged, believe that the Whore of Babylon represents "the world empire of false religion", referring to all other religious groups including, but not limited to, Christendom. Jehovah's Witnesses literature frequently refers to the "Great Harlot" of Babylon and the subsequent attack on her by the political powers, signaling the beginning of the "great tribulation".

View in Thelema

Babalon (also known as the "Scarlet Woman", "Great Mother" or "Mother of Abominations") is a goddess found in Thelema, a religious system which was established in 1904 with the writing of The Book of the Law  by English writer Aleister Crowley. The spelling of the name as "Babalon" was revealed by Crowley in his The Vision and the Voice. Her name and imagery are featured in Crowley's "Liber Cheth vel Vallum Abiegni". 

In her most abstract form, Babalon represents the female sexual impulse and the liberated woman. In the creed of the Gnostic Mass she is also identified with Mother Earth, in her most fertile sense. Along with her status as an archetype or goddess, Crowley believed that Babalon had an earthly aspect or avatar; a living woman who occupied the spiritual office of the 'Scarlet Woman'. This office, first identified in The Book of the Law is usually described as a counterpart to his own identification as "To Mega Therion" (The Great Beast). The role of the Scarlet Woman was to help manifest the energies of the Aeon of Horus. Crowley believed that several women in his life occupied the office of Scarlet Woman, for which see the list below. 

Babalon's consort is Chaos, called the "Father of Life" in the Gnostic Mass, being the male form of the creative principle. Chaos appears in The Vision and the Voice and later in Liber Cheth vel Vallum Abiegni. Separate from her relationship with her consort, Babalon is usually depicted as riding the Beast. She is often referred to as a sacred whore, and her primary symbol is the chalice or graal.

As Crowley wrote in his The Book of Thoth, "she rides astride the Beast; in her left hand she holds the reins, representing the passion which unites them. In her right she holds aloft the cup, the Holy Grail aflame with love and death. In this cup are mingled the elements of the sacrament of the Aeon."

See also
 Anti-Catholicism
 Book of Daniel
 Great Apostasy
 Rastafari § Babylon and Zion
 The Two Babylons
 Woman of the Apocalypse

References

Works cited

External links

 
Anti-Catholic slurs
Babylon
Bible-related controversies
Book of Revelation
Christian terminology
Mythological queens
Roman Empire in art and culture
Seventh-day Adventist theology
Women in the New Testament